The Big Noise is a 1944 comedy film starring the comedic duo Laurel and Hardy. It was produced by Sol M. Wurtzel and directed by Mal St.Clair.

Plot
While cleaning the office of a detective agency, janitors Laurel and Hardy answer a telephone call from an inventor who claims to have created a destructive bomb he calls "The Big Noise." Posing as detectives, the duo move into the inventor's home, where they must contend with his eccentric behavior, oddball widowed aunt (who takes a fancy to Hardy) and his misbehaving nephew. The inventor's neighbors are crooks who are eager to steal the new bomb.

Laurel and Hardy hide the bomb in a concertina and steal an airplane to bring it to Washington. However, the airplane is a remote control target used by the U.S. Army for gunnery training. Laurel and Hardy barely escape by parachuting to safety over the Pacific Ocean, and they dispose of the bomb by dropping it on a Japanese submarine.

Cast

Production
The Big Noise was the fifth of six feature films Laurel and Hardy made at 20th Century Fox during the 1940s. During the film's production, Stan Laurel told an interviewer that efforts were made to support the American World War II domestic effort to conserve materials. "We cut out automobile chases and food wasting-gags when the war first started, and with The Big Noise we decided to slash every gag that might conceivably have bearing on wartime wastages and destruction," he said.

Scenes and gags used in previous Laurel and Hardy films turned up in The Big Noise. Among the earlier films to have their material reused were Berth Marks, Wrong Again, Block-Heads and The Flying Deuces.

Laurel would later recall that he attempted to convince producer Sol M. Wurtzel to recycle the Berth Marks scene involving the duo in a claustrophobic train berth by changing the location of the berth to a transcontinental airplane. Laurel felt having the airplane hitting turbulence with the pair bouncing about in the berth would be funnier than recycling the train-based gags. Laurel's request was rejected, but the film did improve on the original setup by adding comic actor Jack Norton as an inebriate who shares the berth with Laurel and Hardy.

The railroad station scene was filmed at the Atchison, Topeka & Santa Fe Railway station in Arcadia, CA. When Laurel & Hardy speak to the station agent sitting on the baggage cart - one can clearly see the railroad interlocking tower in the background that protects the crossing of the Pacific Electric Railway tracks and the Santa Fe Railway tracks. The Arcadia Station was used for many on location filming over the years. The station building was moved in the late 1960s and is preserved at the LA County Fairgrounds - Steam Giants Railroad Museum in Pomona, CA.
Some filming took place at the Monrovia Airport in Monrovia, California.

Critical and popular reception
The Big Noise was greeted with mixed reviews when it was first released in 1944. Some dismissed the film as a routine rehash of old gags; Bosley Crowther of The New York Times observed, "Once, long ago, it was funny to see them joust with wet paint and folding beds. But now it is dull and pathetic. And they don't even seem to care." Others approved of the film, like Boxoffice magazine: "So long as Laurel and Hardy continue their screen antics, there will always be something for the children to enjoy -- not to mention the grownups who find this comedy team relaxing entertainment... All in all, this should disappoint no one, including the person who counts the boxoffice take." The latter comment proved prophetic, as the film was very successful in theaters and hailed by exhibitors as one of Laurel & Hardy's best. The film stayed in circulation for the next six years, and was reissued in 1954.

The film had a poor reputation for many years, even gaining an entry in the book The Fifty Worst Films of All Time in 1978, though attitudes to the film have somewhat improved in later years, with John V. Brennan at the website Laurel and Hardy Central stating "THE BIG NOISE is better than its reputation, but given that reputation, it would almost have to be."

See also
List of American films of 1944

References

External links

 
 
 

1944 films
1940s English-language films
Laurel and Hardy (film series)
Films directed by Malcolm St. Clair
20th Century Fox films
Films produced by Sol M. Wurtzel
Films scored by David Buttolph
1944 comedy films
American black-and-white films
1940s American films